The Green Guard was an anarchist guerrilla unit in occupied Ukraine during World War II.

History
The Green Guard was formed in 1942 in the Kyiv Oblast, then part of the Reichskommissariat Ukraine, by the former Makhnovist Osip Tsebriy, who had returned from exile in France, on the other end of Nazi-occupied Europe. Tsebriy tried to revive the tradition of the Makhnovschina among the Ukrainian peasants. The partisans fought against the troops of Nazi Germany, as well as those of the Soviet Union, and Ukrainian nationalists. In the winter of 1943, the Green Guard was crushed by anti-partisan German troops. Tsebriy went into hiding with the local peasants for several months, but in the end was captured. Unrecognized, he was imprisoned in a concentration camp in Nazi Germany, from where he was freed by the western Allies in 1945.

See also
Green armies
Revolutionary Insurgent Army of Ukraine
Soviet partisans
Ukrainian Insurgent Army

References

Further reading

1942 establishments in Ukraine
1943 disestablishments in Ukraine
Anarchism in the Soviet Union
Anarchist organizations in Ukraine
Anti-fascist organisations in Ukraine
Defunct anarchist militant groups
Military history of Kyiv
Military history of the Soviet Union during World War II
Military history of Ukraine during World War II
Military units and formations disestablished in 1943
Military units and formations established in 1942
Paramilitary forces of Ukraine
Soviet opposition groups
Ukrainian military formations
World War II resistance movements